The Blue and Gray Museum is the name of at least two American Civil War museums:
 Blue and Gray Museum (Georgia), in Fitzgerald, Georgia
 Blue and Gray Museum (Alabama), in Decatur, Georgia

See also
Blue and Gray
The Blue and the Gray (disambiguation)